Mount Mulayit, (မူႋလာအာ်) also known as Muleh Yit, is a mountain of the Dawna Range. It is located towards the southern end of the range in Kayin State, Burma, 12 km to the NNW of the border with Thailand. 

The Tenasserim white-bellied rat (Niviventer tenaster), the silver-eared laughingthrush (Trochalopteron melanostigma) and the grey-sided thrush (Turdus feae), a vulnerable species, are found in the Mulayit Taung area.

See also
Dawna Range
List of mountains in Burma
Mulayit Wildlife Sanctuary

References

External links
Mulayit Taung (peak) Region: Kayin State, Myanmar
Google Books, The Physical Geography of Southeast Asia

Kayin State
Mountains of Myanmar
Dawna Range